Igor Sani (born 28 December 1986) is a Guinea-Bissauan international footballer who plays for Portuguese team Loures, as a centre forward

Career
Born in Lisbon, Sani has played club football in Portugal and Switzerland for Loures, Igreja Nova, Torreense, Farense, Fátima and Frauenfeld.

He made his senior international debut for Guinea-Bissau in 2014.

References

1986 births
Living people
Portuguese footballers
Bissau-Guinean footballers
Guinea-Bissau international footballers
S.C.U. Torreense players
S.C. Farense players
C.D. Fátima players
FC Frauenfeld players
Association football forwards
Portuguese expatriate footballers
Portuguese expatriate sportspeople in Switzerland
Bissau-Guinean expatriate footballers
Bissau-Guinean expatriate sportspeople in Switzerland
Expatriate footballers in Switzerland
Footballers from Lisbon